Gaobeidian Station  is a station on the  of the Beijing Subway. It is located in the Gaobeidian area of Chaoyang District. There are entry points on either side of the Gaobeidian Bridge.

Station layout 
The station has 2 elevated side platforms.

Exits 
There are 6 exits, lettered A1, A2, A3, A4, B1, and B2. Exits B1 and B2 are accessible.

External links

Beijing Subway stations in Chaoyang District
Railway stations in China opened in 2003